Pokrzywnik  is a village in the administrative district of Gmina Lubomierz, within Lwówek Śląski County, Lower Silesian Voivodeship, in south-western Poland. Prior to 1945 it was in Germany.

References

Villages in Lwówek Śląski County